Grand Roc is a mountain of Savoie, France. It lies in the Massif de la Vanoise range.

See also
 Bochnia Salt Mine, southern Poland, central Europe
 Wieliczka Salt Mine, near Kraków in Poland, central Europe
 Khewra Salt Mine, in Punjab , Pakistan
 Kartchner Caverns State Park in Arizona, the United States
 Salt Cathedral of Zipaquirá, in Zipaquirá, Cundinamarca, Colombia, South America
 Chełm Chalk Tunnels, Poland, central Europe
 Frasassi Caves, Ancona in Italy, southern Europe

Alpine three-thousanders
Mountains of the Alps
Mountains of Savoie